Alexander Zick (born 20 December 1845, Koblenz, Germany – 10 November 1907, Berlin, Germany) was a German painter and illustrator.

Alexander was the greatgrandson of the painter and architect Januarius Zick, the son of fresco artist Johannes Zick.

He was a student of August Wittig and Eduard Bendemann.

Numismatic work 
In his last years in Berlin, Alexander Zick was the designer of 2 German banknotes, the 5 Mark Reichskassenschein 1904, and the 10 Mark Reichskassenschein 1906.

Gallery

Notes

External links

19th-century German painters
German male painters
20th-century German painters
20th-century German male artists
1845 births
1907 deaths
19th-century German male artists